Pikes Peak Library District (PPLD) seeks to engage and transform people’s lives by providing equitable access to information, enrichment opportunities, and community connections via 15 facilities, online resources, and mobile library services. It is a nationally recognized system of public libraries serving a population of more than 650,000 across 2,070 square miles in El Paso County, Colorado.
Pikes Peak Library District has resources for children, teens, adults, and seniors. Library resources are available in multiple languages, large print, audio, video, and electronic formats.

History 
The first public library in the area was opened by the Colorado Springs Social Union in downtown Colorado Springs in October 1885. The Colorado Springs Free Reading Room and Public Library began as a subscription library and housed about 8,000 volumes by 1903. In 1903, the Free Public Library of Colorado Springs was established to hold its growing collection. In 1905, the city of Colorado Springs opened a new free public library with the support of $60,000 in Carnegie funds and property donated by the city's founder, General William J. Palmer. 

In 1917, a new branch is opened in Colorado City. In 1954, the library begins providing its bookmobile service. In March 1955, the Friends of the Pikes Peak Library District is formed to advocate for the library, operate bookstores in the libraries, and host events. In 1962, a regional library district is approved, prompting the building of additional branch locations throughout the county in subsequent years.

In 1996, the historic 1905 Carnegie library is listed on the National Register of Historic Places. The Carnegie library receives a grant for renovation and preservation purposes in 1997; renovations were completed in 2002. In 2004, District circulations exceeded six million items. In 2006, PPLD starts eBranch, enabling patrons to download eBooks and audio materials to their electronic devices. In June 2014, Library 21c opens, "the first of its kind in the country, with makerspaces, a video and recording studio, business and entrepreneurial center, cafe, and performance venue in addition to traditional library materials such as books and movies."

Annual Programs

Adult Reading Program
All Pikes Peak Reads (APPR)
Mountain of Authors
Pikes Peak Regional History Symposium
Summer Adventure for kids and teens

PPLD also partners with the Colorado Springs Science Center to host the annual Colorado Springs Mini Maker Faire at Library 21c.

Locations 
The Pikes Peak Library District provides services at 15 physical locations and through its mobile library.

References

External links
Official site

Education in Colorado Springs, Colorado
Public libraries in Colorado
Library districts
Education in El Paso County, Colorado
1975 establishments in Colorado